Neoregelia guttata is a species of flowering plant in the genus Neoregelia. This species is endemic to Brazil.

References

guttata
Flora of Brazil